Peter Vaughan,  (born 7 September 1962) is a Welsh public servant and retired police chief. He served as the Chief Constable of South Wales Police from January 2010 to December 2017 and is currently Lord Lieutenant of Mid Glamorgan.

Early life and education
Vaughan was born on 7 September 1962 in Aberfan, South Wales. He gained a first class Bachelor of Science degree in Management Science and Operations Research from the University of Wales, Swansea.

Career
Joining South Wales Police on graduation, he progressed to Superintendent leading the Community Safety Department. After a period with head office, he became head of the BCU in Merthyr Tydfil, and then Divisional Commander at Rhondda Cynon Taff.

Vaughan then attended the ACPO Strategic Command Course, and on graduation was appointed Assistant Chief Constable for Wiltshire Constabulary, during which time he led the investigation into the deaths at Tidworth Camp in July 2006. During this period he led the ACPO Police Dog Working Group and Public Order Events team.

He returned to South Wales Police in January 2007 as Assistant Chief Constable, progressing to Deputy Chief Constable in April 2007. Appointed Chief Constable from January 2010, he took over from the retiring Barbara Wilding. Peter Vaughan retired as Chief Constable and left South Wales Police on 31 December 2017. He was succeeded as Chief Constable by Matt Jukes

Honours
Vaughan was awarded the Queen's Police Medal in the 2013 New Year Honours and was appointed Vice Lieutenant of Mid Glamorgan in 2018 and appointed as Lord Lieutenant of Mid Glamorgan in April 2019

Honorary titles

Matt Jukes

References

Living people
People from Aberfan
Alumni of Swansea University
British Chief Constables
Lord-Lieutenants of Mid Glamorgan
1962 births